Hemilienardia ocellata is a species of sea snail, a marine gastropod mollusk in the family Raphitomidae.

Description

The length of the shell varies between 3 mm and 11 mm.

Distribution
This marine species occurs off Mauritius, Fiji, the Philippines, Taiwan and Queensland, Australia.

References

 Melvill, J.C. & Standen, R. 1897. Notes on a collection of shells from Lifu and Uvea, Loyalty Islands, formed by the Rev. James and Mrs Hadfield, with list of species. Part 3. Journal of Conchology 8: 396–421 
 Hedley, C. 1909. Mollusca from the Hope Islands, north Queensland. Proceedings of the Linnean Society of New South Wales 34(1): 420–466, pls 36–44 
 Powell, A.W.B. 1966. The molluscan families Speightiidae and Turridae, an evaluation of the valid taxa, both Recent and fossil, with list of characteristic species. Bulletin of the Auckland Institute and Museum. Auckland, New Zealand 5: 1–184, pls 1–23 
 Wiedrick S.G. (2017). Aberrant geomorphological affinities in four conoidean gastropod genera, Clathurella Carpenter, 1857 (Clathurellidae), Lienardia Jousseaume, 1884 (Clathurellidae), Etrema Hedley, 1918 (Clathurellidae) and Hemilienardia Boettger, 1895 (Raphitomidae), with the description of fourteen new Hemilienardia species from the Indo-Pacific. The Festivus. special issue: 2-45.
Beyond Conus: Phylogenetic relationships of Conidae based on complete mitochondrial genomes. Molecular Phylogenetics and Evolution 107: 142-151

External links
-* Jousseaume, F. (1883). Diagnose d'un nouveau genre de pleurotomidé. Bulletin de la Société Zoologique de France. 8: xl-xli
  Hedley, C. 1922. A revision of the Australian Turridae. Records of the Australian Museum 13(6): 213-359, pls 42-56 
 Fedosov A.E., Stahlschmidt P., Puillandre N., Aznar-Cormano L. & Bouchet P. (2017). Not all spotted cats are leopards: evidence for a Hemilienardia ocellata species complex (Gastropoda: Conoidea: Raphitomidae). European Journal of Taxonomy. 268: 1-20
 
 Gastropods.com: Hemilienardia ocellata
 MNHN, Paris: holotype

ocellata
Gastropods described in 1883